Marco Calogero Aratore (born 4 June 1991) is a Swiss football coach and a former player who played as a midfielder. He is a youth coach at Basel.

Club career
Aratore played in the Basel youth teams and for two years in their U21 team. He was brought up into their first team squad at the age of 18. He played his first game for the side against FC Santa Coloma in the Europa League, but was unable to obtain a place in the first team in the Swiss Super League. During this time he played one sole league match for Basel, one Swiss Cup game and four in the Europa league, scoring a goal in the cup game. Therefore, he was loaned to FC Thun for three months at the end of the 2009–10 season. For the season 2010-11 he was loaned to FC Aarau. The loan was extended for another year. In August 2012 he returned to Basel, but played for the reserve squad in the 1. Liga Promotion, the third highest tier of Swiss football. On 17 January 2013 it was announced that he was loaned to Winterthur so that he could gain playing experience in a higher league. In Summer 2013 his contract with Basel ran out, therefore he signed for Winterthur and played 35 of the 36 games that season. In Summer 2014 he transferred to St. Gallen.

On 13 August 2018, he signed a long-term contract with the Russian club FC Ural Yekaterinburg. On 10 July 2019, he returned to Switzerland to FC Lugano on loan for the 2019–20 season. On 23 September 2020, his Ural contract was terminated by mutual consent.

On 28 September 2020, he returned to FC Aarau and signed a three-year contract.

On 4 July 2022, Aratore returned to Basel and was assigned to the club's Under-21 squad that plays in the third-tier Swiss Promotion League. On 11 January 2023, Aratore retired from playing and was appointed an assistant coach for Basel's Under-14 squad as he continued his coaching education.

International career
Aratore was born in Switzerland and is of Italian descent. Aratore has played for various Swiss youth teams, playing nine games for both the U-16 team and the U-17 team and seven games for the U-18 team. He has also played 13 games for the Switzerland U-19 team, scoring three goals.

He made his international U-20 debut as substitute on 6 September 2010 in the 2–3 home defeat in the Stadion Breite, Schaffhausen, against German U-20 team. He scored his first goal for the Swiss U-20 team on 31 August 2011 in the 3:2 home win against the Italian U-20 team.

Titles and honours

Basel
 Swiss champion at U-16 level: 2005–06 2006–07
 Swiss Cup winner at U-18 level: 2007–08
 Swiss Super League champion: 2010
 Swiss Cup winner: 2010

External links

References

1991 births
Living people
Footballers from Basel
Swiss men's footballers
Association football midfielders
Switzerland youth international footballers
Swiss people of Italian descent
FC Basel players
FC Thun players
FC Aarau players
FC Winterthur players
FC St. Gallen players
FC Ural Yekaterinburg players
FC Lugano players
Swiss Super League players
Swiss Challenge League players
Swiss Promotion League players
Swiss expatriate footballers
Expatriate footballers in Russia
Swiss expatriate sportspeople in Russia
Russian Premier League players